Daniel Pudil (born 27 September 1985) is a Czech former professional footballer who played for the Czech Republic national team and currently plays as a left back or left winger for Northern Counties East League Premier Division club Hallam.

Club career

Czech Republic
Pudil started his youth career in the Czech Republic with Sparta Prague. He left the club at age of eighteen and joined FK Chmel Blšany. At Chmel Blšany Pudil used to play left back in defence and scored two goals in eleven appearances. After six months Pudil joined FC Slovan Liberec. Though making twelve appearances in his first season, Pudil soon became a member of the first team which would win its second league title with Pudil making 29 appearances and scoring three goals. During the season, Pudil scored the first goal of his career in a 2–2 draw against Příbram on 7 November 2005. Throughout the season, Pudil would establish himself in the starting eleven at the club.

In 2007, he had a trial with English side Watford, but manager Aidy Boothroyd decided not to sign Pudil on a permanent contract.

In the 2007–08 season in which he played three games for Slovan Liberec, Pudil left Liberec to join SK Slavia Praha on loan for a season and made his debut on 15 September 2007, in a 0–0 draw against Baník Ostrava; Four days later, he made his Champions League debut in a 2–1 win over Romanian side Steaua București. On 29 September 2007, Pudil then scored his first goal in a 7–1 win over Fastav Zlín; followed four days later when he scored his first goal in a 2–1 loss against Sevilla and his second league goal came in a 2–0 win over Sparta Prague six days later. In the UEFA Champions League third match in the Group Stage, Pudil was in the squad when Arsenal thrashed Slavia 7–0. Six days later after the 7–0 loss, Pudil played against his former club in a 1–1 draw; but the next meeting soon happened again six months later, when Pudil set up a goal for Zdeněk Šenkeřík, to score the only goal in the game. Following Slavia Praha's Champions League elimination to UEFA Cup, Pudil set up a goal for Matej Krajčík to make it 1–1 against Tottenham Hotspur in the second leg. However, Slavia Praha lost 3–1 on aggregate, having lost against them in the first leg. On the final game of the season, Pudil scored in a 2–2 draw against Baumit Jablonec. At the end of the season, Slavia Praha won the league title. Due to his flamboyance and controversial lifestyle, Slavia Praha had decided against signing Pudil.

Genk
Pudil signed for Belgian club KRC Genk from FC Slovan Liberec on 1 July 2008, for worth 1.5 million euros. Pudil was linked with Italian sides Reggina and Lecce but Genk managed to win the race. On the opening game of the season on 17 August 2008, Pudil made his debut for the club in a 1–1 draw against Beerschot; then two appearances later, Pudil scored his first goal in a 3–1 win over Zulte Waregem on 14 September 2008. However the next game, Pudil received a red card after a second bookable offence in a 1–0 loss against Club Brugge. In his first season, Pudil scored four goals in twenty nine appearances. At Genk, Pudil had established himself in the first team during his three seasons at Genk. The next season with Pudil made 27 appearance. However, in the Europa League fourth round second leg against Lille, having loss 2–1 in the first leg, Pudil set up a goal for Elyaniv Barda but received a red card after a second bookable offence. The next season, Pudil was involved in the squad with Genk that won the title for the second time.

He spent three seasons with the Belgian side before joining Granada on a five-and-a-half-year contract in January 2012.

Cesena
After joining Granada, Pudil was immediately loaned out to Cesena for the rest of the 2011–12 season. On 1 February 2012, Pudil made his debut, playing in defensive midfield, in a 0–0 draw against Napoli. Eighteen days later after making his debut, Pudil scored his first goal in a 3–1 loss against A.C. Milan. On 7 March 2012, the match didn't turn well for him when he received a red card after a second bookable offence, just one minute after receiving a yellow in a 0–0 draw against Catania. At the end of the season, Pudil couldn't help Cesena retain their Serie A status as the club was relegated to Serie B.

Watford
Pudil then joined Watford on a season-long loan for the 2012–13 season, joining Czech teammate Matěj Vydra. In pre-season, Pudil played his first match in a friendly against Tottenham Hotspur in Lloyd Doyley's testimonial match but after playing five minutes, he came off with a suspected hamstring injury. This turned out to be a minor injury. Pudil made his Watford debut, in the second game of the season, a 1–0 loss against Ipswich Town.

Having played as a left back for six games, Pudil was slotted into the left midfield role and assisted several goals. On 23 October 2012, Pudil received a straight red card in a 2–1 loss against Cardiff City after violent conduct against Craig Noone. After the game, Watford appealed the decision, with support from Cardiff City and Noone himself. His three-game suspension was thus reduced to one by the FA. In the first match of 2013, Pudil scored his first goal for Watford in a 4–3 loss against Charlton Athletic. Later in the 2012–13 season, Pudil would go on to make 40 appearances in all competitions, and at the end of the season, Pudil would return to Granada, as his loan spell with Watford came to an end.

On 4 July 2013, Pudil announced via Twitter that he had joined Watford permanently from Granada, signing a four-year contract. Pudil's first game after signing for the club on a permanent basis came after coming on for Ikechi Anya in the 75th minute, in the opening game of the season, in a 1–0 win over Birmingham City, while his first goal would come in a 1–1 draw against Charlton Athletic on 14 September 2013.

Sheffield Wednesday
On 29 August 2015, Pudil signed for Sheffield Wednesday on a season-long loan deal. He scored his first goal for Sheffield Wednesday in a 3–1 win over Preston North End on 3 October 2015. Pudil completed a permanent move to Wednesday on 28 July 2016 for £1,500,000. He was released by Sheffield Wednesday at the end of the 2018–19 season.

Mladá Boleslav 
After his release from Sheffield Wednesday in July 2019, he signed for Czech side Mladá Boleslav on a two-year deal.

Viktoria Žižkov 
Pudil signed for Czech side Viktoria Žižkov on a one-year deal for free.

Hallam
On 24 July 2022, Pudil returned to Sheffield and signed for Northern Counties East League Premier Division side Hallam - the second oldest football club in the world.

International career
Pudil represented his country at under-19 and under-21 level. He made his senior debut in 2007 and scored his first goal at this level on 21 November 2007 in a 0–2 away victory against Cyprus in a UEFA Euro 2008 qualifier. Pudil was a member of the Czech Republic squad that competed in UEFA Euro 2016.

Career statistics

Club

International

Honours
Genk
Belgian Cup: 2008–09
Belgian Pro League: 2010–11
Belgian Super Cup: 2011

References

External links
 
 
 
 
 
 krcgenk.be
 sport.be

Living people
1985 births
Footballers from Prague
Association football fullbacks
Association football wingers
Czech footballers
Czech Republic youth international footballers
Czech Republic under-21 international footballers
Czech Republic international footballers
Czech expatriate footballers
SK Slavia Prague players
FK Chmel Blšany players
FC Slovan Liberec players
FK Mladá Boleslav players
K.R.C. Genk players
Granada CF footballers
A.C. Cesena players
Watford F.C. players
Sheffield Wednesday F.C. players
FK Viktoria Žižkov players
Hallam F.C. players
Czech First League players
Belgian Pro League players
Serie A players
English Football League players
Czech National Football League players
UEFA Euro 2016 players
Expatriate footballers in Belgium
Expatriate footballers in Spain
Expatriate footballers in England
Expatriate footballers in Italy
Czech expatriate sportspeople in Belgium
Czech expatriate sportspeople in Spain
Czech expatriate sportspeople in England
Czech expatriate sportspeople in Italy